The  film series consist of street racing films produced by Geneon Universal Entertainment released between 2006 and 2008. All the films are set on racing touge roads.

Film series

Drift (2006)

An ex-boxer (Yuya Endo) races against various black cars on public roads in an effort to get revenge for the crash that killed his wife and child. Throughout the story, he compete with 4 black cars in total, a Mitsubishi GTO, RX-7 FC3S, JZX90 Mark II and a Toyota Chaser.

Drift 2 (2006)

A Japanese street racer looks to track down a legendary racer for revenge. His quest continues.

Drift 3 Taka (2006)

Drift 4 Hayabusa (2007)

Drift Special - Beauty Battle (2007)

Drift 5 (2007)

Drift 6 Z (2008)
Known as Drift Z on Hong Kong releases.

Drift 7 R (2008)
Known as Drift GT-R on Hong Kong releases.

A young street racer Renn has just defeated a red 180SX on the mountain pass. A moment later, he found that the tires of his GTR were stolen by a famous tire-stealing gang! Renn challenged the daughter of the gang's boss. However, the daughter asked him to do a favor after she lost the race!!... With the turned-up GTR, 180 SX, and others race cars, this is exciting car battle action for all car lovers.

References

2000s Japanese-language films
Japanese auto racing films
Japanese film series
2000s Japanese films